Chinatowns exist in many cities around the world. Lists of Chinatowns include:

 Chinatowns in Africa
 Chinatowns in the Americas
 Chinatowns in Canada
 Chinatowns in Latin America
 Chinatowns in the United States
 Chinatowns in Asia
 Chinatowns in Europe
 Chinatowns in Oceania
Chinatowns in Australia

 
Lists of place names
China-related lists
Lists of geography lists